The Farm is a historic home located at Rocky Mount, Franklin County, Virginia. The house was probably built during the late-18th century, expanded in the 1820s, and heavily remodeled in the Greek Revival style around 1856.  It is a two-story, frame dwelling sheathed in weatherboard with a single-pile, central-passage-plan. It features a two-story, projecting front porch. Later additions were made in the late-19th and early-20th century. Also on the property are a contributing one-story brick slave quarters/summer kitchen and the site of a farm office marked by a stone chimney. The house was used as the ironmaster's house for the nearby Washington Iron Furnace.

It was listed on the National Register of Historic Places in 1989.

References

Houses on the National Register of Historic Places in Virginia
Greek Revival houses in Virginia
Houses completed in 1856
Houses in Franklin County, Virginia
National Register of Historic Places in Franklin County, Virginia
Slave cabins and quarters in the United States